Gluboky (masculine), Glubokaya (feminine), or Glubokoye (neuter) may refer to:
Gluboky, Russia (Glubokaya, Glubokoye), name of several inhabited localities in Russia
Hlybokaye (Glubokoye), a town in Vitebsk Oblast, Belarus
Glubokoye, a selo and administrative center of Glubokoye District, East Kazakhstan Oblast, Kazakhstan
Lake Glubokoye (disambiguation), several lakes